is a Japanese football player. He plays for Verspah Oita.

Career
Shogo Tsukada joined J3 League club Kagoshima United FC in 2016. For 2018 season, he opted to sign for Verspah Oita, leaving KUFC after two years.

Club statistics
Updated to 22 February 2018.

References

External links

1993 births
Living people
Kyushu Kyoritsu University alumni
Association football people from Kagoshima Prefecture
Japanese footballers
J3 League players
Japan Football League players
Kagoshima United FC players
Verspah Oita players
Association football defenders